Béatrice Thomas (born June 9, 1984 New York City) is an American born German funk & soul singer.

Biography 
Thomas, daughter of a Buddhist German mother and an African American writer and musician father, worked as a model for several manufacturers of sportsware, amongst others for Nike and Puma. She studied musicology at the Ludwig Maximilian University of Munich, and sang in the bands StreetLIVE Family, King Kamehameha Club Band, Ladies Live, New City Beats, and Technotronic ("Pump up the Jam"). She also worked as background singer, amongst others for Sandra "(I'll Never Be) Maria Magdalena", UB40 and The Temptations. In 2010, she published her first album titled "Blackbird". Thomas lives in North Rhine-Westphalia.

Awards 
 2009, German Rock & Pop Award (Deutscher Rock & Pop Preis ) - "best funk & soul singer"
 2010, German Rock & Pop Award - "best funk & soul music" and "best new rock & pop artist of the year"

References

External links 
 Official website

German soul singers
German female models
Singers from New York City
Musicians from North Rhine-Westphalia
Ludwig Maximilian University of Munich alumni
1984 births
Living people
21st-century American women singers
21st-century American singers
21st-century German women singers
The Voice of Germany
21st-century African-American women singers